The 2016–17 Liga III is the 61st season of the Liga III, the third tier of the Romanian football league system.  The season began on 2 September.

Team changes

To Liga III
Promoted from Liga IV

 Arsenal Malu
 Avântul Valea Mărului
 Axiopolis Cernavodă
 Cetate Râșnov
 CS Şirineasa
 CSMȘ Reșiţa
 FC Bistrița
 FC Hermannstadt
 FCM Alexandria
 Flacăra Moreni
 Gloria Lunca-Teuz Cermei
 Mureșul Vințu de Jos
 Petrolul Berca 
 Recolta Dorolț
 Ripensia Timișoara
 Sportul Chiscani
 Viitorul Ulmeni

Relegated from Liga II
—

From Liga III
Relegated to Liga IV

 Bucovina Rădăuți
 FC Zagon
 Cetatea Târgu Neamț
 Callatis Mangalia
 Inter Olt Slatina
 CSM Sighetu Marmaţiei
 Luceafărul Bălan

Promoted to Liga II

 Sepsi Sfântu Gheorghe
 Juventus București
 Afumați
 ASU Politehnica Timișoara
 Luceafărul Oradea

Teams spared from relegation
Foresta Suceava, Unirea Tărlungeni and Metalul Reșița were spared from relegation to Liga III due to lack of teams in Liga II.

Excluded teams
After the end of the last season, Bucovina Pojorâta, Dorohoi, Caransebeș and Muscelul Câmpulung were dissolved. Oțelul Galați, Universitatea Cluj and Bihor Oradea were also dissolved, but refounded in the middle of 2016 and enrolled in Liga IV respectively Liga V.

Farul Constanța dropped out from the Liga II due to financial difficulties and enrolled in Liga III, but then were excluded from Liga III also.

Ceahlăul Piatra Neamț and Gloria Buzău were relegated to Liga V, because the teams were excluded during the 2015–16 Liga II season.

CS Panciu and FC Hunedoara were excluded from Liga III.

Măgura Cisnădie and Inter Dorohoi withdrew from Liga III.

Sporting Turnu Măgurele and Minerul Motru withdrew from Liga III and dissolved their senior teams, but remain with their youth centers.

CS Ineu withdrew from Liga III and enrolled in Liga IV due to financial difficulties.

Unirea Tărlungeni was moved from Tărlungeni to Ștefăneștii de Jos and took all the players and the staff from CS Ștefănești. CS Ștefănești was dissolved.

Metalul Reșița was moved from Reșița to Snagov and took all the players and the staff of Voința Snagov which was dissolved.

Argeș 1953 Pitești, CS Păulești, Mureșul Vințu de Jos, Petrolul Berca, Siretul Lespezi and Voința Ion Creangă declined participation in Liga III due to lack of funds.

Other teams
SC Bacău withdrew from Liga II due to financial difficulties and enrolled in Liga III.

ACS Poli Timișoara, ASA Târgu Mureș, Astra Giurgiu, CS Mioveni, Gaz Metan Mediaș, Steaua București and UTA Arad enrolled in Liga III their second teams.

Unirea Alba Iulia received the permission to enroll in Liga III, due to the excellent results recorded in the youth championships.

Renamed teams
Petrotub Roman was renamed as CSM Roman.

Gloria Popești-Leordeni was renamed as SC Popești-Leordeni.

League tables

Seria I

Seria II

Seria III

Seria IV

Seria V

Possible relegation
At the end of the championship a special table will be made between 12th places from the 5 series. The last team in this table will relegate also in Liga IV. In this table 12th place teams are included without the points obtained against teams that relegated in their series.

References

2016
3
Romania